Decotelette is a rural village in the Anse d'Hainault commune, in the Anse d'Hainault Arrondissement, in the Grand'Anse department of Haiti.

References

Populated places in Grand'Anse (department)